Cenodocus antennatus is a species of beetle in the family Cerambycidae. It was described by James Thomson in 1864. It is known from Malaysia, Java, Borneo, Laos and Sumatra.

References

Pteropliini
Beetles described in 1864